Alexander James Johnson (born December 24, 1991) is an American football linebacker who is a free agent. He played college football at Tennessee.

Early years
Johnson attended and played high school football at Gainesville High School, the same school as future NFL quarterback Deshaun Watson.

College career 
Johnson attended the University of Tennessee, where he played college football under head coaches Derek Dooley and Butch Jones. Johnson made 138 tackles in 2012 to lead the Southeastern Conference in that category.  He made 106 tackles in 2013, and was named First-team All-SEC.

He was also named a Freshman All-American by the Football Writers Association of America in 2011.

Following speculation that he might skip his final year of eligibility to enter the NFL Draft, Johnson announced in January 2014 that he would remain at Tennessee for his senior year.  In April 2014, Johnson was named a Strength and Conditioning All-American by the National Strength and Conditioning Association.

Suspension
On November 18, 2014, Johnson was suspended from the University of Tennessee after he was accused of rape. Two days prior, Johnson threw a party at his apartment. A woman, who was visiting out of state, stated she had previously had two sexual encounters with Johnson. She alleged that she was shocked when Johnson immediately began having sex with her after entering his bedroom. She then alleges that Johnson's fellow teammate Michael Williams joined and began raping her alongside Johnson. On February 12, 2015, Johnson and Williams were both officially indicted on two counts of aggravated rape by a grand jury.

On July 27, 2018, Johnson and Williams were acquitted of all charges.

Professional career

Johnson initially received an invitation to attend the 2015 NFL Scouting Combine. On February 13, 2015, it was reported that the NFL had officially rescinded Johnson's invitation to the NFL Combine after he was indicted on two counts of aggravated rape the day prior. Johnson was projected to be a third or fourth round pick by the majority of NFL draft experts before he was accused of rape.

Denver Broncos

2018
Johnson signed with the Denver Broncos as an undrafted free agent on August 13, 2018 after being acquitted of his rape charges. He made the Broncos 53-man roster, only playing in one game through 11 weeks before being waived on November 29, 2018. After clearing waivers, he was re-signed to the Broncos practice squad. He signed a reserve/future contract with the Broncos on January 2, 2019.

2019
In Week 5, against the Los Angeles Chargers, Johnson made his first career start. He intercepted a pass from Philip Rivers in the end zone as the Broncos won 20-13. In Week 6, against the Tennessee Titans, he made 9 total tackles with 1.5 sacks and 1 tackle for loss as the Broncos won 16-0. In Week 9 against the Cleveland Browns, Johnson recorded a team-high 13 tackles in the 24-19 win.

Johnson recorded five total tackles in a Week 14 road contest against the Houston Texans and former Gainesville High teammate Deshaun Watson. The linebacker also forced a Keke Coutee fumble that teammate Kareem Jackson returned for a 70-yard touchdown en route to a 38-24 Broncos victory.

Johnson finished 2019 as Pro Football Focus's #4 rated linebacker and #46 player in the whole NFL, a ranking that PFF wrote would have been "much higher" if he had started the entire season.

2021
The Broncos placed a second-round restricted free agent tender on Johnson on March 16, 2021. He signed the one-year contract on May 20. He entered the 2021 season as a starting linebacker. He suffered a torn pectoral in Week 6 and was placed on season-ending injured reserve on October 19, 2021.

Seattle Seahawks
On October 26, 2022, Johnson was signed to the Seattle Seahawks practice squad.

References

External links 

Denver Broncos bio
Tennessee Volunteers bio

1991 births
Living people
American football linebackers
Denver Broncos players
People from Gainesville, Georgia
Players of American football from Georgia (U.S. state)
Seattle Seahawks players
Sportspeople from the Atlanta metropolitan area
Tennessee Volunteers football players